The Svenson Blacksmith Shop is a historic commercial building in Astoria, Oregon, United States.

It was listed on the National Register of Historic Places in 1986.

See also
National Register of Historic Places listings in Clatsop County, Oregon

References

External links

1920 establishments in Oregon
Blacksmith shops
Commercial buildings completed in 1920
National Register of Historic Places in Astoria, Oregon